The 1826 Maine gubernatorial election took place on September 11, 1826. Incumbent Democratic-Republican Governor Albion Parris did not run for re-election. Democratic-Republican candidate Enoch Lincoln won election virtually unopposed.

Results

References

Gubernatorial
1826
Maine
September 1826 events